The long-footed treeshrew (Tupaia longipes) is a treeshrew species within the Tupaiidae. It is endemic to Borneo and threatened due to deforestation and degradation of habitat.

References

Treeshrews
Mammals of Brunei
Mammals of Indonesia
Mammals of Malaysia
Mammals of Borneo
Endemic fauna of Borneo
Mammals described in 1893
Taxa named by Oldfield Thomas
Taxonomy articles created by Polbot